Hajji Morad (also Romanized as Hājjī Morād) is a village in Mirbag-e Jonubi Rural District, in the Central District of Delfan County, Lorestan Province, Iran. At the 2006 census, its population was 81, in 18 families.

References 

Towns and villages in Delfan County